The soundtrack for the 2021 American Western film The Harder They Fall, produced by Overbrook Entertainment, consists of an original score composed by the film's writer and director Jeymes Samuel, as well as original songs performed by various artists.

The original soundtrack was released on October 29, 2021, by Roc Nation ahead of the film's streaming release on Netflix the following week. In addition to streaming and digital formats, the album was physically released on CD, vinyl, and cassette. The 14 track album is composed of original songs written for the film performed by Jeymes Samuel, Jay-Z, Kid Cudi, CeeLo Green, Seal, and Laura Mvula among others with skits taken from the film interspersed.

The original score was released digitally by Roc Nation on January 14, 2022. The score was composed entirely by Samuel, featuring The Chamber Orchestra of London on several tracks.

Background
Jeymes Samuel, the film's writer, director, composer, and producer, wrote and produced all songs on the soundtrack alongside contributions from some of the soundtracks' performers. Samuel also executive produced the soundtrack with Jay-Z, with whom he had collaborated previously on The Great Gatsby: Music from Baz Luhrmann's Film, with Carter serving as executive producer and Samuel serving as executive musical consultant under his stage name The Bullitts. All of the songs on the soundtrack appear in the film, and the track "Guns Go Bang" first appeared in the film's trailer on September 28. Samuel, known for blending film and music, explained his approach to the soundtrack as "a versatile body of work that blends genres and eras in an innovative way."

Critical reception
The soundtrack was released to positive reviews, both for the roster of artists included and the quality of its songs. The "star-studded" collaborations were praised for celebrating "every corner of Black culture". The songs, described as "winningly cinematic" by Variety, were hailed for their "dynamic, symphonic grandness" and for representing a range of genres while "maintaining a cohesive sense of sonic drama." Samuel's use of the "anachronistic soundtrack" in the film received high praise as well. In contrast to the scores typical of classic Westerns, Samuel employed music from modern genres such as hip hop, reggae, and R&B, which was "expertly placed to emphasize the events of the movie in a way that goes beyond audiences’ normal expectations from a movie score" according to Screen Rant.

Release

The Harder They Fall (The Motion Picture Soundtrack)

The Harder They Fall (Original Score) 
An album featuring Samuel's score was released digitally by Roc Nation on January 14, 2022.

All music composed by Jeymes Samuel

References

Further reading
 What ‘The Harder They Fall’ Is Communicating Through Its Soundtrack. Netflix. Retrieved January 12, 2022
 ‘The Harder They Fall’ Director Jeymes Samuel on Writing the Score Alongside the Script: “Words Have Melodies”. The Hollywood Reporter. Retrieved December 3, 2021

2021 soundtrack albums
Roc Nation soundtracks
2020s film soundtrack albums
Film scores
Western film soundtracks
Hip hop soundtracks
Action film soundtracks
2022 soundtrack albums
Albums produced by The Bullitts